This article is a list of historical Slovene newspapers that were published in Slovene.

1888–1944 Dom in svet, literary monthly
1938–1941 Dejanje, Christian left journal
1876–1928 Edinost, Slovene daily in Trieste
Glas naroda
1918–1928 Goriška straža, newspaper for the Slovenes of Goriška under Italian administration
1819–1849 Illyrisches Blatt, Slovene and German intellectual, France Prešeren's Wreath of Sonnets was first published in it
1920–1945 Jutro, leading interwar liberal newspaper
1843-1902 Kmetijske in rokodelske novice, started as an agricultural and craftmen's publication but became a conservative political and literary newspaper
1907–1911 Korošec, weekly newspaper of Carinthian Slovenes
1920–1938 Koroški Slovenec, main newspaper of the Carinthian Slovenes in the First Austrian Republic
1830–1848 Krajnska čbelica, literary almanac
1924–1930 Križ na gori (later Križ), Christian left magazine
1881–1941 Ljubljanski zvon, literary
1797–1800 Lublanske novice, general newspaper, its editor was Valentin Vodnik
from 17 September 1944 until the end of the Second World War Partizanski dnevnik, the only daily newspaper published by a resistance group in occupied Europe
Prosveta, published in USA
1873–1945 Slovenec, Catholic political
1858–1869 Slovenski glasnik, cultural magazine, published in Klagenfurt
1868–1943 Slovenski narod, leading Slovene liberal newspaper
1881–1940 Slovenski pravnik, legal herald
1871–1915 Soča, Slovene newspaper published in Gorizia, also published illegally in fascist Italy in 1927
1934–1941 Straža v viharju, journal of the Slovene Integralist Catholic youth
1966–1990 Zaliv, Slovene cultural and intellectual review, published in Trieste, Italy

See also
List of newspapers in Slovenia
List of magazines in Slovenia

External links